Jocelyne Khoueiry (15 August 1955 – 31 July 2020) was a Lebanese female militant of the Kataeb Party and an  activist during the Lebanese Civil War.

Biography
A Maronite Christian, Khoueiry was active in the Kataeb Party. During the Civil War, the Christian militia fought against the Palestinian fighters of the Palestinian Liberation Organization (PLO). On 7 May 1976, she defended a building overlooking Martyr's Square in Beirut alongside six other girls against 300 Palestinian fighters. Khoueiry killed their leader, causing the militia to panic and flee following a six-hour span. An image of Khoueiry received worldwide attention.

Khoueiry led up to 1,000 combatants under her orders. The number of women reached 1,500 in 1983. She laid down her arms in 1986.

In 1988, Lebanese filmmaker Jocelyne Saab made a film about Khoueiry. The film, broadcast on Canal+, was titled La Tueuse and reports on her passage of faith during the Lebanese Civil War.

She founded three associations: La Libanaise 31 mai, Oui à la Vie" and the Centre Jean-Paul II. In 2012, she participated in a synod on the Middle East. In 2014, she participated in the Third Extraordinary General Assembly of the Synod of Bishops and was appointed to the Pontifical Council for the Laity.

Jocelyne Khoueiry died in Jbeil on 31 July 2020 at the age of 64.

See also 

 Massoud Achkar
 Assaad Chaftari

References

20th-century Lebanese women
People of the Lebanese Civil War
21st-century Lebanese women
2020 deaths
Kataeb Party politicians
1955 births
Lebanese Maronites